Koktobe is a village in Eskeldi District of Almaty Region, in south-eastern Kazakhstan.

References

Populated places in Almaty Region